A desert rose is an intricate rose-like formation of crystal clusters of gypsum or baryte, which include abundant sand grains. The "petals" are crystals flattened on the c axis, fanning open in radiating clusters.

The rosette crystal habit tends to occur when the crystals form in arid sandy conditions, such as the evaporation of a shallow salt basin. The crystals form a circular array of flat plates, giving the rock a shape similar to a rose blossom. Gypsum roses usually have better defined, sharper edges than baryte roses. Celestine and other bladed evaporite minerals may also form rosette clusters.

The ambient sand that is incorporated into the crystal structure, or otherwise encrusts the crystals, varies with the local environment. If iron oxides are present, the rosettes take on a rusty tone.

The desert rose may also be known by the names: sand rose, Sahara rose, rose rock, selenite rose, gypsum rose and baryte (barite) rose.

Locations

Sahara
Sand roses are found in large numbers in surroundings of the salt lake of Chott el Djerid in South-West Tunisia, as well as the neighboring regions in Algeria and Ghadames, Libya. Local inhabitants extract them and sell them as souvenirs to tourists, creating a sustainable income to local population. Other sandroses are found elsewhere in the Sahara, but those extracted in the surroundings of the Salt Lake are particularly beautiful because of the high percentage of salt in their composition making them more crystalline and luminous. Others that contain more sand have a rusty tone, hence less brilliant in day or artificial light. Sand roses are also found in the vicinity of Abqaiq, Saudi Arabia.

Oklahoma
Rose rock in Oklahoma was formed during the Permian Period, 250 million years ago, when western and central Oklahoma was covered by a shallow sea.  As the sea retreated, baryte precipitated out of the water and crystallized around grains of quartz sand.  This left behind large formation of reddish sandstone, locally called Garber Sandstone, containing deposits of rose rock.

The rose rock was selected as the official rock of the US state of Oklahoma in 1968.

Size

See also
 National Museum of Qatar

References

External links

Timberlake Rose Rock Museum in Noble, Oklahoma
3D model of a desert rose

Crystals
Sulfate minerals